Arnaud-Michel d'Abbadie d'Arrast (The Chambers Biographical Dictionary calls him "Michel Arnaud d'Abbadie".) born 24 July 1815 in Dublin and died 8 November 1893 in Ciboure was an Irish-born French and Basque explorer known for his travels in Ethiopia with his elder brother Antoine d'Abbadie d'Arrast. Arnaud was a geographer, ethnologist, linguist, familiar with the Abyssinian polemarch and an active witness to their battles and the life of their courts. 
The general account of the travels of the two brothers was published by Arnaud in 1868 under the title Douze ans dans la Haute-Ethiopie ("Twelve Years of Residence in Upper Ethiopia").

Family biography
Arnaud's father, Michel Arnauld d'Abbadie (1772-1832), who died in Paris of cholera, descended from an old family of lay abbots of Arrast, a commune in the canton of Mauléon. In 1791, to avoid the aftermath of the Revolution, Michel Arnauld emigrated first to Spain, then to England and Ireland where he was a shipowner and imported wines from Spain. He married Eliza Thompson of Park (1779–1865), daughter of a doctor, on 18 July 1807 in Thurles, County Tipperaryl.

Arnaud d'Abbadie, born July 24, 1815 in Dublin, was the fourth child and second son of six children:

Elisa (1808-1875), who married Alexandre Glais-Bizoin;
Antoine (1810-1896);
Celina (1811-1894),
Arnaud Michel (1815-1893);
Juilia (1820-1900), who married Bernard Cluzeau de Cléran;
Charles Jean (1821-1901), who married Marie-Augustine-Émilie-Henriette Coulomb

Arnaud's father, who returned to France in 1820, had obtained from Louis XVIII the addition of d'Arrast to his patronymic name of Abbadie.It was only in 1883 that Arnaud, Charles and his son Arnauld Michel asked to legally add d'Arrast to their patronymic name.

1815-1836

Until these twelve years, Arnaud, just like Antoine is educated by a governess. He then entered the Lycée Henri-IV in Paris. Arnauld has a great facility to learn languages. He speaks perfect English, Latin and Greek.

At seventeen, his friends introduce him to Freemasonry as a benevolent philanthropic society. Arnaud therefore approaches this sect, but on the day of the initiation he is asked to commit himself under the seal of an oath not to reveal the secrets of the sect. It was a revelation for him:
So he refused to commit himself to this dubious oath.

Around the age of twenty, Arnaud wanted to engage militarily , because the colonization of Algeria fascinated him. However, his mother is adamantly opposed to him heading for a military career. To calm his ambitions, she sent him to Audaux in the Basque Country, on the lands of his ancestors. Arnauld travels the Basque Country and learns Basque. He lives with his brother Antoine in the castle of Audaux.

Since filial respect forbids him to serve his country by force of arms and that he wants a life of action, Arnauld decides to carry the good name of the France otherwise. He knows his elder brother's plan to explore Abyssinia and decides to accompany him with the aim of discovering "the sources of the Nile".

Since November 1836 Antoine is on a scientific mission in Brazil; it measures the diurnal variations of the Earth's magnetic field at the request of  François Arago. He accepted the proposal of his brother, who immediately left for Egypt to prepare the expedition. Antoine returned to France in September 1837; he submitted his observations to the Academy of Sciences, and on 1 October he embarked at Marseilles, with his scientific equipment, a secretary and a servant, for Egypt.

Exploration of Abyssinia (1837-1849)

The exploration of Abyssinia, largely unknown to nineteenth-century Europeans, will occupy Antoine and Arnauld for twelve years.

Context of the trip 

The early nineteenth century marked the rise of exploration of Africa by European countries in search of colonial empires. At first, we limit ourselves to the recognition of the great rivers. The geography, geodesy, geology and ethnography of vast African regions remain totally unknown, so the triangle: Harar-Mogadishu-Cape Guardafui of the Horn of Africa is white on maps of 1840.

The territory to explore is huge. The brothers of Abbadie are limited to Abyssinia, whose four provinces represent more than 300,000 km2. Penetration conditions are extremely difficult:

 ethnic quarrels are permanent; Loyal allies one day can become enemies the next. Historians call it the Era of Princes or the Zemene Mesafint;
 religious wars are numerous (Catholic, Protestant, Muslim, Copt, animist, Jewish);
 the linguistic barriers are numerous (the Ethiopian alphabet has 267 characters with about thirty languages and dialects);
 endemic diseases are numerous: typhus, leprosy, ophthalmia;
 suspicion of colonial powers hinders research: English, Italians, Germans and Turks suspect Abbadie's brothers of being spies.

Antoine and Arnaud d'Abbadie have very specific objectives:

 for Arnaud, it is the search for the source of the Nile;
 for Antoine, it is first and foremost with a scientific purpose. He wants to map the country, make geodetic and astronomical measurements. He invented new techniques and the maps he produced were surpassed only by the arrival of aerial and satellite photography;
 both brothers are devout Catholics from a family of lay abbots. Antoine says it himself, without the events of 1793, he would sign:" Antoine d’Abbadie, abbé lai d’Arrast en Soule " . We can see in them scientific crusaders. They also go to the Ethiopian mountains to help the declining Christian religion, threatened by a conquering Islam. ;
 to travel to this hostile country, it is necessary to know its habits and customs. Before leaving the France, they have inquired as best they can and once there, their ethnological, linguistic, political observations are of the utmost importance;
 for Arnaud, it is a project that takes shape as it is implanted in political life. He wants to reconstitute the former Christian empire of Ethiopia at the expense of Muslim occupation. In addition, he wanted to link this future state to the "protection" of the France and thus thwart British colonization in East Africa.

Stay in Abyssinia

The two brothers know the languages and especially the local customs. Their characters are very different: 

 Antoine, the scientist, is the most conciliatory in appearance, but by perseverance and patience he gets what he wants. He wears the clothes and looks of Ethiopians dedicated to study, a "memhir".  He walks barefoot, for only lepers and Jews wear sandals. He worked assiduously to "settle down" and soon he was called "the man of the book";

 Arnaud was born to command. He uses his knowledge to be flamboyant, and stand out from the population. He is known to all as a fair, honest and faithful man. He forged links with princes and warlords, participated in battles, came close to death many times and escaped thanks to exceptional courage. He forged a reputation as a soothsayer and advisor, but he was above all the friend and confidant of Dejazmach Goshu, prince of Gojjam, who considered him his son and gave him the honorary title of "ras", equivalent to duke in the European nobility. Arnauld is known as "ras Mikaël" (Arnauld's first name is Michel and he chose the name Mikaël, more familiar to Ethiopians).

In 1987 the historian, jurist linguist; High Ethiopian official and academic Berhanou Abebe publishes verses, distiches, dating from the Era of Princes, which refer to Arnauld ("ras Mikael"): "I have not even provisions to offer them, / Let the earth devour me in the place of the men of ras Mikael. / Is it clumsiness of embossing, or lack of swarf / That the scabbard of Mikael's sword is not trimmed with pompom ?".

For tactical reasons Arnaud and Antoine decide to travel separately. During their long stay Arnaud and Antoine spent little time together. The two brothers often write to each other, send messengers, sometimes make walks of several days to spend only a few hours together. The only event that unites them is Ennarea's expedition to the kingdom of Kaffa in search of the source of the White Nile.

In the exploration of Abyssinia, Arnaud prepares the ground for Antoine: first visits and approaches to the local lords etc., then Antoine does his work quietly. This tactic allows Antoine to gather valuable information on the geography, geology, archeology and natural history of Ethiopia.

1837-1839

Antoine d'Abbadie arrived in Egypt around October 16, 1837 and joined his brother Arnaud who was already in Cairo. The two brothers stay about two months in Cairo and become friends with Giuseppe Sapeto, a Lazarist father and Mr. Richards, an English explorer. In December 1837 the two brothers, together with Father Sapeto, left for Massawa, the port of entry to Abyssinia.

As soon as they arrive, a public rumor announces that the Dejazmach Wube , governor of Tigray, the first region they must cross, has massacred a Protestant mission and prohibited its territory to any European, on pain of death.

Mr. Richards realizes the difficulties they must face and returns to Cairo. Arnaud and Father Sapeto go to Adwa to speak directly with Dejazmach Wube. Antoine stays in Massawa with their luggage.

The rumor is false, the Protestant mission was not massacred. She was imprisoned and expelled from Tigray, because the missionaries do not respect enough the rites of the Ethiopian church and the Marian devotions. Arnaud uses his diplomatic talent with Dejazmach Wube and allows Father Sapeto to stay in Adwa and that he and Antoine can cross Tigray without incident.

Arnaud and Antoine arrive in Gondar on May 28, 1838. As soon as Antoine begins his work of geodesy and cartography he realizes that his instruments are not suitable for precision work; He must return to France and obtain adequate instruments. He embarked at Massawa in July 1838 and returned twenty months later in February 1840.

In Gondar, Atse Lik Atskou, a learned high dignitary, takes Arnaud under his protection and presents to him:

to Ali, ras of Begemder, who is the same age as Arnaud and has the same sporting passions; they become friends. Ali's mother, Menen Liben Amede, Ali's former regent, is a very powerful woman and she too accepts Arnaud.

Through common sense advice and his honorable attitude, Arnaud acquired the reputation of being a doctor and a diviner. Among the important people who show him their friendship, there are:

Sahle Selassie, prince of Shewa, the richest province of Abyssinia, which promises him its help to travel in Ennarea, region where the brothers of Abbadie think to find the source of the white Nile
 Dejazmach Goshu, prince of Gojjam, who is under the suzerainty of Ras Ali and who becomes Arnaud's closest friend in Abyssinia. Dejazmach Goshu sends one of his sons, Lij Dori to Gondar to be treated by Arnaud, with the invitation to come to Gojjam. You have to go through the Gojjam to enter the Ennarea, so Arnaud accepts the invitation and travels south, towards Dambatch, with Lij Dori and his troops. It was during this trip that Arnaud witnessed his first battle (a warlord trying to kidnap Lidj Dori, to better negotiate a deal with  Dejazmach Goshu) and, more importantly, Arnaud visited the "Eye of Abay" the source of the Blue Nile.

Arrived at the court of  Dejazmach Goshu, Arnauld, thanks to his bravery and his military sense, is accepted as adopted son by  Dejazmach Goshu and his wife Waïzoro Sahaloa. He takes part in a campaign against the Gallas and exchanges his geographer's clothes for those of an Ethiopian soldier.

On the death of Dejazmach Conefo, governor of Dembiya, subservient to Ras Ali, a war of succession broke out. Ras Ali binds with Dejazmach Goshu and his son Birru against the sons of Dejazmach Conefo. Arnaud took part in the Battle of Konzoula on October 4, 1839, during which Conefo's sons were taken prisoner. He becomes the "Ras Mikael".

Antoine must be back in February 1840. In January, Arnaud leaves the court of Goshu to wait for his brother in Massawa. Crossing the Tigray is not easy; the Dejazmach Wube is “difficult”, but Arnaud manages to cross it.

1840-1842

Antoine d'Abbadie arrived with his new geodesy instruments in Massawa in February 1840. The two brothers left for Adwa on February 12. The objective is to return to Gondar where Antoine will do his geodetic surveys for several months, while Arnaud will go to Gojjam, to the court of Dejazmach Goshu. Then, together, they will cross the country of the Galla to reach the kingdom of Ennaréa where they think they will find the source of the White Nile.

They must first cross the Tigray. Its governor, the Dejazmach Wube, is very aggressive towards them. During their courtesy visit, Arnaud annoys Wube who, under the effect of his consumption of mead, threatens to cut off his tongue, a hand and a foot. Arnaud has the choice between using his weapon, or accepting the punishment to save his brother's life. His courage impresses and Wube reconsiders his decision. He orders Arnaud and Antoine to leave his territory immediately, and never to return.

In Adwa, the brothers separate; Arnaud, defying the prohibition of Dejazmach Wube, remains in Adwa with his horse which is suffering; Antoine leaves for Massawa with luggage and servants.

Antoine travels around the Massawa region, using his new instruments to map it for several months. During a hunting accident, a shrapnel from a cartridge injured his eye. He is forced to leave for Aden where he hopes to find a doctor.

Arnaud travels to Digsa where he binds with Bahar Negach. During this period, Arnaud increases his reputation, because he succeeds in recovering several Christian women sold like slaves. As soon as Arnaud receives news of his brother's accident, he leaves for Aden. Unable to keep his horse, he sends it to the Prince of Joineville who helped Antoine to obtain his geodesy instruments.

The trip to Aden is complicated, as the region is under English rule and Captain Haines believes that Arnaud and Antoine are spies for France.

When Arnaud arrives in Aden, Antoine, who has already left for Cairo for treatment, left a message: they can try to reach the kingdom of Ennarea from the south, via Berbera, the region of Harar and the Shewa, or Prince Sahle Selassie will protect them.

Once the two brothers arrived in Berbera the local potentates, under the influence of the English, blocked them. Antoine and Arnaud cannot travel within the country. During their forced stay, they deepen their knowledge of languages, habits and customs; Antoine collects manuscripts and prepares a dictionary.

On January 15, 1841, they left Berbara, made too inhospitable by the actions of Captain Haines, to go to the port of Tadjoura. Their plan is always to join the kingdom of Ennarea from the south.

After three months of attempted negotiations, faced with pressure from Captain Haines, they abandoned the project and on May 12, 1841 they left Djibouti for Yemen. The brothers are badly received in Yemen, because they are Christians. Antoine returns to Massawa. Arnaud leaves on a mission for Jeddah then finds Antoine in August 1841.

They are still trying to cross the Tigray. Arnaud leaves alone for Adwa, stopping at Digsa and against all advice, he visits the Dejazmach Wube. The political situation has changed. Now Wube is waging war against Ras Ali and he is allied with  Dejazmach Goshu. Arnaud is received with great fanfare by Dejazmach Wube.

1842-1844

Thanks to the Dejazmach Wube's change of alliance, Arnaud can cross Tigray to go to Gojjam and Antoine can stay in Tigray and travel freely. He arrive in Adwa on January 2, 1842 and spent several months making geodetic measurements. Then, during a battle, the Dejazmach Wube is taken prisoner and the territory is in turmoil. Antoine is forced to find refuge for several weeks in a church in Adwa, then he escapes and goes to Gondar.

In Gondar Antoine studies languages, collects manuscripts and makes geodesic triangulations (850 absolute landmarks for cartography). Towards the end of September he visits Lake Tana and in January-February the churches of Lalibela. Antoine left Gondar in February 1843 and left for Gojjam.

In the meantime, Arnaud, after leaving the Dejazmach Wube, went to Gondar where he learned of the victory of Ras Ali over the Dejazmach Goshu and his son Birru at the Battle of Dabra Tabor on February 13, 1842. He renewed his contacts with the Lik Atskou; the Waizoro Mannan and the Abuna.

In August 1842 Arnaud left Gondar to find the Dejazmach Goshu and his wife the Waïzoro Sahalou near Dorokoa. He also renews his relations with Birru, the illegitimate son of Goshu, who is encamped with his army in the vicinity. Arnaud is totally involved in military life with Goshu and Birru.

In February 1843 the armies of Goshu and Birru meet to fight Ras Ali. Antoine arrives on February 27. He is charged by the Abuna of Aksoum with a mediation project between Ras Ali and Dejazmach Goshu in order to avoid a confrontation. Despite Arnaud's intercession, the mission fails.

Antoine wants to go back with Arnauld to the kingdom of Ennarea in search of the source of the White Nile. Given the military situation, Arnaud decides that he must stay with the Dejazmach Goshu. He believes that Goshu's influence over the Galla tribes can protect his brother on this dangerous expedition. So Antoine left alone, on May 19, 1843, for Mota to continue his research.

The campaign against Ras Ali begins. The two armies crossed the Abbey and fought in Wello until the end of June 1843. Arnaud was with Birru. The latter appreciates his qualities and forces him to stay by his side. He also wants to separate Arnaud and Goshu, as he intends to take his father's place.

Arnaud and other devotees of Goshu trick to leave the camp of Birru in October 1843 and to go in the city of Mota then to join the camp of Goshu.

At the beginning of 1844 he finally receives news from his brother: Antoine is captive in Galla country, with Abba Bagibo, Prince of Ennarea.

Antoine, who left with a caravan in May 1843, arrived in Saka, in the kingdom of Limmu-Ennarea, on July 26. He is received in audience by King Abba Bagibo. The latter suspects Antoine, the first white man he has seen, of supernatural knowledge. He keeps him at his court.

The King of Kaffa wants to see the white man and asks Abba Bagibo to send him. In exchange, he accepts an alliance that Bagibo had wanted for a long time. Antoine is sent by Abba Bagibo as a "marriage brother" to arrange the marriage of a king's daughter to Abba Bagibo. He is the first European to visit the Kaffa. He stayed 14 days in Bonga, then returned with Abba Bagibo on December 19, 1843. He feared he would never be able to return to Gojjam.

To recover his brother, Arnaud threatens to stop, with his army, all the caravans that want to enter the country of Abba Bagibo if his brother is not freed. On February 25, 1844, Antoine left Ennarea with a caravan and returned to Gojjam on April 10, 1844. He visited the source of the Abaïe and made geodetic measurements, then went to Baguina, to the Agew. He returned to Gondar on July 30, 1844.

In the meantime, Dejazmach Goshu has been taken prisoner by the Dejazmach Syoum. At this time, Birru is plotting against his father. The vassals loyal to the Goshu are relieved of their positions of responsibility. Birru insists on keeping Arnaud with him, promising him honors and territories if he accepts his suzerainty. Birru doesn't want to let Arnaud go to Ras Ali to negotiate his father's release because he's afraid Arnaud will succeed!

Arnaud remains faithful to his friend Goshu and, dodging Birru's troops, arrives at Debre Tabor around May 15, 1844. He wants to negotiate the release of Goshu with Ras Ali.

Ras Ali receives "Ras Mikaël" with all the honors and Arnaud convinces him that the best political solution is to free Goshu. The problem is that Goshu is held back by Ali's mother who has a strained relationship with her son. So Arnaud leaves for Gondar to negotiate directly with her. Arnaud is helped by Atse Yohannès (second husband of Menen Liben Amede).

Menen's grievance against Goshu is simply that he is Birru's father. The quarrel between Ali and Birru is irreconcilable and Birru's wife, Oubdar, is Menen's favorite daughter. She hates her son-in-law and wants her daughter back, so she offers to trade her for Goshu's release. Birro, who secretly did not want his father's release, disrupted the negotiations in April 1844.

Thanks to the talents of Arnaud, the interventions of Lik Atskou and Ali the second attempt at negotiation is a success: Goshu is brought to Gondar, Menen forgives him and he is released. Goshouet Arnaud leave for Debre Tabor in order to seal the reconciliation with Ras Ali.

The alliances change again: Goshu and Syoum, under the suzerainty of Ali, are allied against Birru and Wube. Birru increases his army up to 50,000 men. Faction warfare, as is often the case, consists of many battles, with no winner or loser.

Arnaud returned to Gondar in July 1844 and was joined by Antoine on July 30. The latter left for Massawa on September 25 and returned around December 20. Gathered in Gondar, the two brothers analyze the information in their possession on the possible hypotheses concerning the source of the White Nile. They believe that the Gibe, which revolves around the Kaffa, should unite with the Omo, which is, according to the opinion of Joseph-Pons d'Arnaud, the main tributary of the White Nile. Despite the dangers they plan a second trip to Ennaréa, to determine the source of the Gibe.

1844-1846

The two brothers left Gondar on February 18, 1845. Antoine left for Kouarato, on his way to the kingdom of Enarea, and Arnaud for the hot springs of Gur Amba. In Gur Amba, he meets Walter Plowden, an English explorer, who left his companion John Bell (future advisor to Tewodros II) at Mahadera Mariam. A fight between a man from Arnaud, who injures a native, poses a problem. There is a threat of a trial, with very serious consequences for Arnaud if the man dies. To avoid danger, Arnaud and Plowden immediately leave for Kouarata near Lake Tana to join Antoine, Goshu and Ali. They arrived on March 8, 1845.

In order to increase his military power, Goshu goes on tour with Arnaud to recruit deserters from Birru. They returned to Kouarata on April 8, 1845.

As for Antoine, he leaves with Ras Ali to go to Gojjam, because it takes an escort of armed troops to cross the country infested by various factions opposed to Ali and Goshu. Antoine left Ali on April 14, 1845 and traveled south alone.

The internal war between Ali, Goshu, Birru, Wube is in full swing. Arnaud participates very actively, with a lot of intelligence and bravery. He is so appreciated by Goshu that the latter offers to entrust him with the command of his armies. At the same time, Antoine calls him to leave Goshu and come to Ennarea to seek the source of the White Nile.

Arnaud is torn between Goshu and his brother. After careful consideration, Arnaud announces to Goshu that he must join his brother, but after their expedition, he will come back to him. With sadness, Goshu gives his blessing to Arnaud's journey. It is also necessary to obtain Ali's authorization to join Antoine and Ali categorically refuses to let Arnaud leave. He is too useful as a soldier.

However, Arnaud manages to convince Ali that if he entrusts him with a diplomatic mission to the prince of Enarea, Abba Bagibo, the result will only be beneficial for Ali. The mission will also protect Arnaud against mistreatment by Abba Bagibo.

Arnaud leaves with a caravan which goes towards Ennarea. On the way, he still meets Plowden and Bell and, together, they cross the blue river to arrive in Oromo country. The two Englishmen carry rifles to protect themselves, but Arnaud advises them to get rid of all their firearms, because they provoke the covetousness of the Gallas, who will not hesitate to kill to obtain them and in case of use, if Plowden or Bell kill a galla, all Europeans in the vicinity will be massacred!

After the crossing, Arnaud and the English separate, each with their Oromo protector; Arnauld's is Choumi, a Galla notable. Arnauld arrived in the village of Choumi on July 8, 1845.

Plowden does not follow Arnaud's instructions and a few days later, during a confrontation with a band of gallas, he kills a man. The consequence is that all surrounding Oromo armed bands want to massacre any European on their territory. The road to Ennarea is now blocked for Arnauld.

Stuck at Choumi, Arnaud cannot return to Gojjam. He takes advantage of this period of inactivity to learn the Galla languages. In the villages, Arnaud uses his knowledge of customs and psychology to practice geomancy. He impresses and has the reputation of being a diviner!

On August 25, Arnaud receives news from Antoine. He is at Abba Bagibo's, the latter wants Arnaud to come to his house. Antoine says that an open road may be possible (but still very dangerous). Arnauld leaves with six men and crosses hostile countries.

On December 10, Arnaud crosses the Gibé and is safe in the kingdom of Limmou-Enaréa. He arrived in Saqqa, the main town of Enaréa on December 15, 1845. Antoine was there.

After leaving Ali on April 14, 1846, Antoine crossed Abaye again and, unescorted, he arrived in the kingdom of Jimma in June. Ten days later, he crosses the border of the kingdom of Limma-Enarea and begins to collect information on the rivers and their sources. He ended up recognizing in the Gibé the main tributary of the Omo and therefore of the White Nile. The source is in the Ababya forest north of Jimma.

Arnaud and Antoine have an audience with Abba Bagibo on 20 decent 1845 and they ask him for permission to go to the source of the Gibé, under the pretext of making an offering to a local god. Abba Bagibo, a recent convert to Islam, also keeps ancestral beliefs and he grants them their request.

The two brothers left Saqqa on January 15 and arrived at the source on January 19, 1846.

The source found, you have to leave the kingdom and return to Gojjam!

Antoine and Arnaud are retained as "hosts" by Abba Bagibo. He wants to use Arnaud's "divinatory gift" for his own ends. Escape is almost impossible, it was necessary to kill several guards, to cross deserts, to avoid armed gangs. To get out, Arnaud plans to hide his brother in a caravan leaving the country, then after, escape himself and try to cross Ennarea and the Oromo country alone. But, before putting the plan into execution, a whim of Abba Bagibo opens the way out: Abba Bagibo wants a relative of Ras Ali as his wife and he entrusts Arnaud with negotiating! The two brothers leave Saqqa with all the honors!

The return route is strewn with difficulties, quarrels between tribes; they are repeatedly threatened with death. They were forced to separate and only reunited in December 1846.

1847-1849

Arnaud and Antoine arrived in Gondar on April 20, 1847 along the eastern coast of Lake Tana. They learn that their younger brother, Charles is in Massawa and is looking for them. Indeed, their mother, without news of them for almost twelve years, is worried; she seeks advice and help from the Vatican and the Viceroy of Egypt, then sends her third son to Ethiopia.

Antoine explored Agame and in 1848 that of Semien Gondar where he climbed Ras Dashen, the highest point in Ethiopia and the Simien Mountains. His elevation measurement (4,600 meters) is very close to the modern estimate (4,550 meters).

Unfortunately, Antoine's chronic ophthalmia makes him blind and he is forced to leave Abyssinia for good. On October 4, 1848, Antoine left Massawa and arrived in Cairo on November 3. Arnaud and Charles leave Massawa at the end of November. The three brothers returned to France at the beginning of 1849.

Sources of the Nile

Since ancient times it has been known that the Nile results from the confluence of two rivers near Khartoum in Sudan, the Blue Nile and the White Nile. The origin of these two rivers remains a mystery until the eighteenth century. The goal of the brothers of Abbadie is to find the source of the White Nile, which some geographers (especially Joseph-Pons d'Arnaud) believe to be in the kingdom of Kaffa.

Blue Nile 

The source of the Blue Nile was found by the Portuguese monk Pedro Páez,in 1618 and visited by the Scottish explorer James Bruce in 1770. The river rises near Gish Abay, 100 kilometers southwest of Lake Tana, crosses the lake with a sensible current (as the Rhône crosses Lake Geneva), then exits at Baher Dar and makes a long loop towards Khartoum.

In 1840-1841 (the date is not specified), Arnaud is in the vicinity of the spring with the troops of Lidj Dori and he takes the time to visit it. He is the third European to visit the site. He gives a rather brief description. Arnauld attaches little importance to the precise, more or less arbitrary, naming of the source of a river with multiple tributaries: 
In June-July 1844, Antoine was at the side of the army of Dejazmach Birru, (son of Dejazmach Goshu), who wanted to subdue two provinces that were near the source. Naturally, Antony wants to be the fifth European to visit the source: "The Eye of Abbaia" (the English explorer mentioned by Antony in his account is probably Charles Beke, who followed the course of the Blue Nile from Khartoum). Birru gives him an escort of fifteen spears to protect him in a hostile country. Antoine gives a detailed description of the source and the geographical measurements he makes.

White Nile 

There remains the White Nile and its source. In April 1844, Antoine published his ideas and observations on the rivers that were the possible tributaries for the White Nile.

Antoine and Arnaud d'Abbadie believe that the Omo River is the main tributary of the White Nile. Because the Ghibie River is the main tributary of the Omo, they consider the source of the Ghibie to be the source of the White Nile. After suffering many difficulties and dangers, on January 15, 1846, the two brothers arrived at the source of the Ghibie in the Babya forest north of Jimma. They planted the French flag and drank to the health of King Louis-Philippe I.
The coordinates of the source are: 7° 56' 37.68" N, 36° 54' 183 E28.

Unfortunately, their basic assumption is wrong: the Omo is not a tributary of the White Nile.

As soon as Antoine announced the discovery, his assertion was contested, notably by the English explorer Charles Beke. Antoine d'Abbadie retaliated as soon as he became aware of Beke's communication.

The published correspondence between Antoine d'Abbadie and Charles Beke is very hushed, but vitriolic. Beke analyzes Antony's observations in detail and indicates a number of plausible errors or inconsistencies. But the situation between the two men is such that Beke openly says that he believes that Antoine d'Abbadie never made his trip to the kingdom of Kaffa and that he invented everything. In protest, Beke returned his gold medal, awarded by the Geographical Society in 1846, for his exploration of the Blue Nile.

1850-1893 

On 26 July 1850 Antoine and Arnaud d'Abbadie d'Arrast received the gold medal of the Société de Géographie.

On September 27, 1850, the two brothers were made knights of the Legion of Honor.

His ambitions for Ethiopia 

This trip to Ethiopia made a strong impression on Arnaud who became attached to this country.

He had only one idea in mind: to make his friend the Dejazmach Goshu the new emperor of Ethiopia and link their two countries:

Return to Ethiopia 

Arnaud did not return to France to leave Ethiopia, but on a mission. He wanted to complete his project of the Christian empire of Ethiopia with Dejazmach Goshu as emperor, under the protection of the France.

He addressed his report to the government through the Duke of Bassano. The latter responded favourably and, without an official mission, Arnaud was instructed to bring diplomatic gifts to Goshu on behalf of the France intended to promote an alliance.

Arnaud's mother, worried about this return, made her son promise not to cross the Tekezé, a sub-tributary of the Black Nile on the western border of Tigray. She wants him to stay in an area from where he can easily reach the sea to return to France.

As soon as he landed in Massawa, the news of the return of "Ras Mikael" spread; his former soldiers gave him a triumph; the Dejazmach Goshu is looking forward to seeing his friend again. Unfortunately, Goshu is on the other side of the river in the Gojjam. Arnaud kept his promise and was unable to join Goshu. They exchanged many letters, but Arnaud remained faithful to his oath.

In November 1852, the Battle of Gur Amba ended with the death of Dejazmach Goshu and the victory of Kassa Hailou, the future Tewodros II.

For Arnaud, it is a disaster; He has lost a very dear friend. His hope of building a Christian empire vanished with him. Desperate, he returned to France at the end of December 1852.

His last attempt to link France and Ethiopia was in 1863. The British are omnipresent in the region (Sudan, Aden, Somalia) and aim to take Ethiopia under their protection. The Negus was prepared to resist the British offer if the France sent him military aid. Arnaud asked Napoleon III for an audience to explain the advantages to be expected for the France. The emperor listened politely, but for questions of alliances signed with England, he refused to intervene. In 1868 the British expedition to Ethiopia put Ethiopia under the protection of the British Empire.

Arnaud travelled relatively soon after 1853. He did, however, go to Jerusalem where he wanted to found, at his own expense, an asylum for Ethiopian pilgrims who went to this city.

Second marriage and children

Arnaud married an American, Elisabeth West Young, she was the daughter of Robert West Young (1805-1880), a physician and Anne Porter Webb.

They had nine children:
 Anne Elisabeth (1865-1918) ;
 Michel Robert (1866-1900) ;
 Thérèse (1867-1945) ;                                                          
 Ferdinand Guilhem (1870-1915)                                      
 Marie-Angèle (1871-1955) ;
 Camille Arnauld (1873-1968) ;
 Jéhan Augustin (1874-1912) ;
 Martial (1878-1914) ;
 Marc Antoine (1883-1914).

His salon, rue de Grenelle, was a regular appointment for intelligent and educated men, but Arnauld hated worldliness and he left Paris with his family to return to the Basque Country. He built the castle of Elhorriaga in Ciboure by the architect Lucien Cottet (the castle was occupied by the Wehrmacht during the Second World War and was destroyed in 1985 to make way for a real estate project).

Life in Ciboure and death

In Ciboure he was quickly surrounded by a reputation as a charitable man, but he always remained discreet. The first volume of the account of travels in Ethiopia was published by Arnauld in 1868 under the title of Twelve years of stay in Upper Ethiopia. It recounts the period 1837-1841. The next three volumes were not published during his lifetime. Volume 1 was translated for the first time in 2016 into the Ethiopian language and Volume 2 in 2020.

Arnaud did not forget his patriotism and in 1870 he tried to form a free company and lead it to defeat the invasion. His call was heard and the company was about to leave when the armistice was signed on January 28, 1871.

At the time of the decrees expelling the congregations in 1880, Arnauld put his house, located a few kilometers from the Spanish border, at the service of the victims of these sectarian laws. The Fathers of the Society of Jesus are above all his guests.

Arnaud died on 8 November 1893, he is buried in the cemetery of Ciboure. The photograph in Ethiopian clothes was taken shortly before his death.

The memory of "Ras Mikael" remained alive in Ethiopia for a long time, indeed Emperor Menelik II and his wife referred to him:

References

Bibliography

External links 

 
 

1815 births
1893 deaths
French explorers
Irish people of Basque descent
Irish emigrants to France
French-Basque people